Stephensen is a surname. Notable people with the surname include:

 Dana Stephensen (born 1984/85), Australian ballet dancer
 Felix Stephensen (born 1990), Norwegian poker player
 Marta María Stephensen (1770–1805), Icelandic writer
 P. R. Stephensen (1901–1965), Australian writer, publisher, and political activist
 Stephan Stephensen

See also